The 1945 Edgewood Arsenal explosion killed twelve munitions workers and injured more than fifty on May 25, 1945. Building 509 at Edgewood Arsenal in Harford County, Maryland was a production facility for the assembly of phosphorus igniter assemblies for incendiary bombs, employing a female staff of about 135 assemblers. Nine workers, of whom eight were African-American, were killed in the initial blast, and three more died of their injuries.

References

1945 disasters in the United States
1945 in Maryland
Explosions in 1945
Industrial fires and explosions in the United States
Military history of Maryland